Three hundred and twenty-two Guggenheim Fellowships were awarded in 1958. $1,412,000 in funds was disbursed.

1958 U.S. and Canadian Fellows

1958 Latin American and Caribbean Fellows

See also
 Guggenheim Fellowship
 List of Guggenheim Fellowships awarded in 1957
 List of Guggenheim Fellowships awarded in 1959

References

1958
1958 awards